07 Vestur is a Faroese football club, which was founded in 2007. It is located in Sandavágur and Sørvágur on Vágar island.

History 
The club was founded 18 December 1993 as FS Vágar. It was a merger of Vágar island teams MB Miðvágur and SÍF Sandavágur in order to increase the footballing standard of this part of the Faroe Islands. SÍ Sørvágur, also located on Vágar, joined the club in 1998. Soon, the newly founded club promoted to the national top league which, at that point in 1995, was called 1. deild. Unfortunately, the team was not able to permanently secure a top-tier spot over the years. In 2003, FS Vágar was relegated for good. Soon after that, the alliance between the three founding clubs began to crumble, and FS Vágar was eventually disbanded in the fall of 2004.

Despite the controversy, many people wanted to keep the club alive or, if this was not possible, found another club. So, on 8 November 2004, the club was re-founded as FS Vágar 2004 (FSV04). In fall 2007, talks about a merger between FSV04 and SÍ Sørvágur, one of the members of the first incarnation of the club, started and were successfully concluded on 6 November 2007. The club was renamed 07 Vestur, shortly afterwards. The new name refers both to the founding year of the new club and the location of Vágar island, which is approximately 7° W.

The club currently maintains two men's teams and also a women's team. In 2009, the men's first team played in the Faroe Islands Premier League, but they were relegated and played in 1. deild in 2010. They won 1. deild and were promoted to the Premier League; in 2011, they were playing in the Premier League of Faroese football, but again they remained there for only one season, they ended as 9th with 24 points and got relegated to 1. deild. The first-team gained promotion to Effodeildin in 2012 after winning 1. deild with 68 points. In 2013, the team was relegated to 1. deild again and played there until they were promoted again after the 2016 season.

Honours 
1. deild
 Winners: 1999, 2002, 2008, 2010, 2012

Current squad

Notable former players 
National players
 Torkil Nielsen, former national player for the Faroe Islands. He scored the goal for the Faroe Islands in 1990 in the match against Austria, which Faroe Islands won 1–0.

Managers 

 Tommy Christiansen (1990)
 Finn Røntved (1995)
 Albert Ellefsen & Páll Fróði Joensen (1995)
 Albert Ellefsen (1996)
 Piotr Krakowski (1997)
 Kęstutis Latoža (2000–01)
 Albert Ellefsen (2001)
 Suni á Dalbø (2002)
 Albert Ellefsen (2002–03)
 Jógvan Nordbúð (2004)
 Bill McLeod Jacobsen (2005–06)
 Hegga Samuelsen (2006)
 Jan Dam (2007)
 Piotr Krakowski (January 1, 2008 – December 31, 2009)
 Hegga Samuelsen (October 1, 2010 – May 27, 2011)
 Jóhan Nielsen (June 1 – Dec 31, 2011)
 Piotr Krakowski (Jan 1, 2012 – 2013)
 Hegga Samuelsen (2014—2016)
 Trygvi Mortensen (2017)
 Pauli Poulsen (2018)
 Julian Madsen (2019—2020)
 Heðin Askham (2020—2021)
 Magnus Powell (2021)
 Matthew Potter (2021–)

References

External links 

 Official page

Vagar
Association football clubs established in 2007
2007 establishments in the Faroe Islands